Giulio Sanguineti (born 20 February, 1932 in Lavagna) is an Italian Catholic bishop, from 19 July 2007 bishop emeritus of Brescia.

Born in Santa Giulia di Centaura, Lavagna, in the province of Genoa and diocese of Chiavari, on 20 February 1932, the youngest of three brothers. On March 20 he was baptized in the church of Santa Giulia di Centaura. He attended Pontifical Gregorian University, where he obtained a degree in canon law. 

On 15 December 1980 Pope John Paul II appointed him bishop of Savona and also Noli.  Archbishop Giovanni Canestri (later cardinal) and he received episcopal ordination from bishop Belchior Joaquim da Silva Neto on 6 January 1981, in the Vatican.  On 30 September 1986, following the full union of the two dioceses, he became bishop of Savona-Noli. 

On 7 December 1989 he was appointed bishop of La Spezia-Sarzana-Brugnato by John Paull II.  In 1995 he was elected president of the CEI Commission for social communications; he remained in office until 2000. 

On 19 December 1998 Pope John Paul II named him bishop of Brescia and 28 February 1999 he took possession of the diocese. 

On 13 November 2002, at the former Libreria Queriniana of Brescia, he inaugurated the new headquarters of the Centro Oratori Bresciani, aimed at Youth Ministry in Brescia. 

On 19 July 2007 Pope Benedict XVI accepted his renunciation, presented due to age limits;  Luciano Monari succeeded him, until then bishop of Piacenza-Bobbio. 

From 17 September 2007 he lived in Rapallo, but since November 2010 he lives in Santa Giulia di Centaura, his hometown.

References

Living people
1932 births
20th-century Italian Roman Catholic bishops
21st-century Italian Roman Catholic bishops